Children's non-fiction literature (also called informational) is the meeting of the genres children's literature and non-fiction. Its primary function is to describe, inform, explain, persuade, and instruct about aspects of the real world, but much non-fiction also entertains.

Generally books of this genre feature simpler words and ideas, as well as pictures. It is, however, a very broad genre, involving several of the same topics that can be encountered in normal nonfiction, including biographies, diaries, encyclopedias, handbooks, history and more of the like.

See also

Aventis Prize
Sibert Medal
List of children's non-fiction authors.

References